KWRR (89.5 FM) was a public radio station in Ethete, Wyoming, serving residents of the Wind River Indian Reservation. Programming on KWRR consisted of local programming (including country music), plus programs from National Public Radio and Native Voice One. It was established in 1996. As of June, 2018 the station has been off the air.

The Federal Communications Commission cancelled KWRR's license on October 4, 2021, due to the station failing to file an application to renew its license.

External links
Native Voice One website

NPR member stations
WRR
Native American radio
Radio stations established in 1996
1996 establishments in Wyoming
Radio stations disestablished in 2021
2021 disestablishments in Wyoming
Defunct radio stations in the United States
WRR
Wind River Indian Reservation
Fremont County, Wyoming
Arapaho